Hayman Kent (born 3 May ?) is an Australian comedian, TV and radio personality, singer, actress and writer. She is currently a co-host on the RMITV flagship production Live on Bowen.  While studying a Bachelor of Music at university, Kent tried her hand at stand up comedy and soon appeared in Raw Comedy 2012 and made it into the National finals top 12 at age 21.

References

External links
 
 
 

Australian stand-up comedians
People from Victoria (Australia)
Living people
Year of birth missing (living people)
Australian television presenters
Australian women comedians
RMITV alumni
Australian women television presenters